The First Ten Years is a series of 10 CDs and double 12" singles by British heavy metal band Iron Maiden, released between 24 February and 28 April 1990, in commemoration of the band's ten-year recording anniversary.

Each CD/double 12" contains two singles, complete with original B-sides and artwork, as well as an edition of "Listen with Nicko", a spoken-word track in which drummer Nicko McBrain would recount the history behind each song specific to that release. Each part in the series included a special voucher, all ten of which could be exchanged by mail order for a limited edition storage box.

Iron Maiden also released The First Ten Years: The Videos on VHS videotape and laserdisc, containing all 16 of the band's promotional music videos up to and including 1990's "Holy Smoke".

Track listings

Chart positions

References

Compilation album series
Iron Maiden compilation albums
1990 compilation albums
1990 video albums
Music video compilation albums
Heavy metal compilation albums